Bunko may refer to:

 Bunkobon, a Japanese book format
 Bunko Kanazawa, a Japanese adult film actress
 Bunco (also Bunko and Bonko), a parlor game played in teams with three dice
 A confidence trick, also known as a bunco game